Eden Lake is a 2008 British-French horror thriller film written and directed by James Watkins and starring Kelly Reilly, Michael Fassbender and Jack O'Connell.

The film was nominated for the Empire Award for Best British Film. It is among a group of roughly contemporaneous films that deal with concerns over "Broken Britain" and a fear of "hoodies". Some of the close up scenes were filmed at Frensham Small Pond.

Plot
Steve Taylor takes his girlfriend Jenny Greengrass to a remote lake in the wooded English countryside for a relaxing weekend away, where he plans to propose. On the way, they meet a young boy named Adam.

As Steve and Jenny attempt to wind down, the peaceful setting is disrupted by a gang of rowdy teenagers who have ridden their bicycles to a spot within a few metres of the young couple. Steve asks them to keep the noise down, but is met with abuse. The next morning, Steve and Jenny find their food supplies infested with insects and their car tire damaged by a bottle left behind by the teens. While driving into town for breakfast, Steve spots a house with bikes outside that he thinks belong to the teens. When no one answers the door, Steve enters the house and proceeds to snoop around. But on the return of Jon, the surly homeowner, Steve is obliged to make his escape from an upstairs window.

Back at the lake after waking from a nap, Steve and Jenny discover the bag containing their car keys and Steve's phone and wallet is missing. They return to where they parked their car to discover it is also gone. Returning to town on foot, they avoid a collision with their own car, driven recklessly through the woods by the gang's psychopathic leader, Brett.

Finding the gang in the woods after nightfall, Steve demands the return of his belongings, only to be pounced by the teens who pull out knives. In the scuffle, Brett's dog Bonnie is mortally stabbed, sending Brett into a maniacal rage. The couple grab the keys and flee, but the gang throws stones at the car, causing Steve to crash. With Steve trapped, Jenny is forced to run for help.

At daybreak, Jenny stumbles upon the group who have tied Steve to a rock with barbed wire. Brett orders each reluctant teen to stab him. When Paige, the female gang member, records Steve's torture on her phone, they realise they have no choice but to kill him. Jenny acts as a decoy and the gang give chase while Steve buys time to free himself. Jenny evades the gang and finds Steve, but is unable to nurse his fatal wounds. She finds an engagement ring in his pocket, and Steve proposes to her before dying. Jenny runs off to find help but accidentally steps on a large spike and her screams get the gang's attention.

Jenny runs into Adam and begs for help, but he ends up informing the gang of their location. They tie Jenny, along with Steve's dead body, to a pile of wood; Brett forces Adam to light a bonfire while Paige films it. Jenny is able to escape and Brett necklaces Adam in retaliation. Jenny continues to evade the gang, killing a younger gang member Cooper who was attempting to help her. After finding his body, Brett is thrown into further rage and beats Harry, another gang member, to death. Paige runs away in fear. Jenny reaches a road and is picked up by a driver who is looking for his brother Ricky, another gang member. When he exits the van to talk with Ricky, Jenny drives off, running over Paige in the process.

As Jenny makes it back to town, she crashes into a fence at a large backyard party and collapses. She awakes to find herself being comforted by a woman and her husband Jon, and soon realises she is in Brett's house. Jon notices Reece's van on his lawn as one of the other parents receives a call informing her of the dead gang members, who are the children of the adults at the house.

A commotion begins as Jenny locks herself in the bathroom. Jon kicks the door in and is confronted by all of the party guests, as well as Brett who has returned home. Brett has convinced the adults that Jenny and Steve sadistically murdered the gang members. Jenny begs Jon to call the police and then tries ineffectually to attack him with a razor she found in the bathroom, but Jon quickly subdues her. Jon tells Brett to go upstairs, then takes Jenny back into the bathroom with two other men. Brett shuts the door of his room, blocking out her screams. He deletes the videos of the gang's crimes from Paige's phone, puts on Steve's sunglasses, and stares blankly into a mirror.

Cast

Production

Critical reception
On Rotten Tomatoes, a review aggregator, 80% of 28 surveyed critics gave the film a positive review; the average rating is 6.4/10. The site's critical consensus reads: "A brutal and effective British hoodie-horror that, despite the clichés, stays on the right side of scary."

Dennis Harvey reviewed the film for Variety and said that it was "an effectively harrowing Brit thriller-cum-horror pic," comparing it to Last House on the Left and Lord of the Flies. The Guardians Peter Bradshaw drew parallels with Deliverance, Straw Dogs and Blue Remembered Hills, and stated that "this looks to me like the best British horror film in years: nasty, scary and tight as a drum," concluding that the film was "exceptionally well made, ruthlessly extreme, relentlessly upsetting."

Other critics, however, have savaged the film, denouncing it as an incitement to class prejudice against working class people in Britain. The Sun condemned the film's "nasty suggestion that all working-class people are thugs" while The Daily Telegraph concluded that "this ugly witless film expresses fear and loathing of ordinary English people". Owen Jones, in his book Chavs: The Demonization of the Working Class cites the film at length as an example of media demonisation of proletarian youth via the "Chav" stereotype. He comments, "Here was a film arguing that the middle classes could no longer live alongside the quasi-bestial lower orders."

Eden Lake has been linked with other films that deal with concerns over "Broken Britain" and a fear of "hoodies," including Harry Brown, The Disappeared, Summer Scars, Outlaw, The Great Ecstasy of Robert Carmichael, Cherry Tree Lane and Heartless.

See also
 Cinema of the United Kingdom
 Mathil Mel Poonai, a 2013 Tamil language thriller that bears several similarities to Eden Lake.
 NH10, a Hindi movie loosely draws its plot from the film adapted to an Indian context.

References

External links
 
 
 

2000s exploitation films
2000s gang films
2000s horror thriller films
2008 directorial debut films
2008 films
2008 horror films
2008 independent films
2000s crime thriller films
British crime thriller films
British exploitation films
British horror thriller films
British independent films
British slasher films
British survival films
Films about couples
Films about murderers
Pathé films
Films scored by David Julyan
Films shot in Buckinghamshire
2000s English-language films
Films directed by James Watkins
2000s British films
2000s French films
British horror films
French crime thriller films
French exploitation films
French horror thriller films
French independent films
French slasher films
French survival films
English-language French films